'L'Extase matérielle' is an essay written  by French Nobel laureate J. M. G. Le Clézio. The book's title means Material Ecstasy in English. This essay may be advising that we should pay the utmost attention to what there is around us, not to what there might be or ought to be. According to a review of 'L'Extase matérielle' the reasoning behind the essay is to accept that "what there is is all there is"(and to demand more is ludicrous)

Writing style
This essay consists of personal deliberations, discursively written, which are (probably) intended more to provoke his readers than to comfort them. Le Clézio seems to have been motivated to write this essay not just taking ideas from other writers, but also to explain his own research and also to relate his very own perspective on life. The essay is emotionally written.

Principles
This is  a collection of essays which explicitly theorize  many of the principles Le Clézio himself wrote in Terra Amata. Le Clezio expresses his fondness for small things in these essays.

Themes in L'extase materielle
  Le Clézio meditates about his bedroom
  Le Clézio writes about the woman
 (and about the woman's body)
  Le Clézio writes of love,
(even of a fly or a spider)
  Le Clézio discourses on  writing
  Le Clézio`writes about death
  Le Clézio gives some ideas of what he thinks "an absolute" (of anything) could be

Publication history

First French Edition
Re-Printed 1971

Second French Edition

Third French Edition

References

2004 essays
Essays by J. M. G. Le Clézio
Works by J. M. G. Le Clézio